Francesco Comelli (1744 in Parigi – 1816 in Bologna) was an Italian scientific instrument maker.

A skilled craftsman, Comelli was a well-known maker of machines, instruments, and clocks and an innovator in the design of metal presses. In 1780, was appointed "regulator" of the public clock in Bologna. Has considerable expertise in foundry and metalworking. A device designed by Comelli was used by Gianbattista Guglielmini in experiments to measure the rotation of the earth in 1791.

References 

Italian scientific instrument makers
People from the Province of Parma